is a mountain in Japan located in Yamanouchi, Nagano. For the 1998 Winter Olympics, it hosted the alpine skiing giant slalom events.

References
 1998 Winter Olympics official report. Volume 2. pp. 191–3.
 Shinmai.co.jp 1998 Winter Olympics profile of the mountain.

Venues of the 1998 Winter Olympics
Olympic alpine skiing venues
Higashidate